U.S. Route 127 (US 127) in Tennessee is a  United States Numbered Highway from Chattanooga to the Kentucky state line at Static. The highways connects through Dunlap, Pikeville, Crossville, and Jamestown.  Throughout its length, US 127 straddles the line between East Tennessee and Middle Tennessee.

Route description

Hamilton County

US 127 begins in Red Bank at an interchange between US 27 (SR 27/SR 29) and SR 8 (Dayton Boulevard), with US 127 heading northwest, along with SR 8 and SR 27 as its hidden, or secret, companions to pass through the northern portion of Chattanooga as a six-lane undivided highway known as Signal Mountain Road. The highway passes through industrial areas for a couple of miles, where SR 27 splits off along Suck Creek Road, before leaving the Chattanooga city limits and ascending onto the Cumberland Plateau as a two-lane highway. US 127/SR 8 passes through the towns of Signal Mountain, Walden, and Fairmount before entering Sequatchie County.

Sequatchie County

US 127/SR 8 passes through the Lone Oak community before descending into the Sequatchie Valley and passing through farmland. The highway passes through Center Point, where it meets SR 283 and crosses the Sequatchie River, to enter Dunlap and has a Y-intersection with SR 28, with that designation joining US 127 for its remainder in the state. US 127/SR 8/SR 28 passes northeast directly through downtown along Rankin Avenue to have an interchange with SR 111 after passing through some neighborhoods. Here SR 8 becomes signed and splits off along SR 111 north while US 127/SR 28 leaves Dunlap to head through rural farmland for the next several miles to cross into Bledsoe County.

From Dunlap northward, US 127 parallels the Sequatchie River.

Bledsoe County

The highway now passes through Palio, Lusk, and Lees Station before entering Pikeville at an intersection with SR 30. They then run concurrently to bypass downtown before splitting off to the west; US 127/SR 28 continues north through farmland to pass through Cold Spring and Melvine before pulling away from the Sequatchie River and ascending back onto the Cumberland Plateau and entering Cumberland County.

Cumberland County

US 127/SR 28 immediately has an intersection with Vandever Road, which is a connector to SR 282 and Lake Tansi Village. The highways then goes through more farmland before passing by Cumberland Mountain State Park and an intersection with SR 419. The highway now passes through Cumberland Homesteads, where it has a Y-intersection with SR 68, and US 127/SR 28 turns northeast to enter Crossville. US 127/SR 28 intersects SR 392 (a beltway around downtown) before entering downtown and an intersection with US 70/SR 1/SR 101. It then passes through downtown before widening to four lanes and junctioning with SR 298. US 127/SR 28 then has an intersection with US 70N/SR 24 before going through Crossville's main business district and crossing the Obed River and coming to an interchange with I-40 (exit 317). US 127/SR 28 then leaves Crossville, narrowing to two lanes, and continuing north through more farmland. It then crosses into Fentress County via a couple of sharp switchbacks, in order to negotiate a bridge over Clear Creek.

Fentress County

US 127/SR 28 then goes through more farmland before entering Clarkrange to an intersection with SR 62. US 127/SR 28 then passes through Clarkrange before an intersection with SR 85 and entering Grimsley. It then passes through Grimsley before widening to four lanes to pass by Jamestown Municipal Airport and intersect SR 296 west of Allardt. It then enters Jamestown and bypasses downtown, beginning with the intersection with Main Street (Old US 127/SR 28) to the east and an interchange with SR 52 before another  with SR 154. The highway then leaves Jamestown, at the other end of Main Street (Old US 127/SR 28), and continues north and narrowing to two lanes, winding its way through rural and hilly terrain for several miles. It then passes through Sgt. Alvin C. York State Historic Park and Pall Mall, where the highway crosses the Wolf River, before passing through Forbus and having an intersection with Caney Creek Road (connector to Kentucky Route 200). The highway crosses into Pickett County shortly thereafter.

Pickett County

The highway winds it way through rural areas for several miles to intersect with SR 325, and then SR 295, before passing through Chanute and entering Static, intersecting both Kentucky Route 1076 and SR 111 immediately before crossing the state line into Kentucky; SR 28 ends there and US 127 continues into Kentucky towards the town of Albany.

History 

US 127's current alignment was signed solely as SR 28 until the US 127 corridor's southern terminus was relocated to Chattanooga when the US route was extended south from Cincinnati, Ohio. From 1958 until the 2010s, US 127’s southern terminus was originally located in downtown Chattanooga, where it intersected US 41 during that route’s concurrency with US 76.

In 1987, the entire alignment of US 127 in Tennessee and Kentucky became the main route for the first annual 127 Corridor Sale. The yard sale route has since extended into other areas along US 127 into Ohio, as well as varied state highways in southern Hamilton County, and into northwest Georgia and northeast Alabama. The tradition continues until this day, and this year's yard sale will be the 43rd annual one.

Junction list

See also

References

External links

127 Corridor Sale

27-1
 Tennessee
Transportation in Chattanooga, Tennessee
Transportation in Hamilton County, Tennessee
Transportation in Sequatchie County, Tennessee
Transportation in Bledsoe County, Tennessee
Transportation in Cumberland County, Tennessee
Transportation in Fentress County, Tennessee
Transportation in Pickett County, Tennessee